Altered States is a 1980 American science fiction body horror film directed by Ken Russell and based on the novel of the same name by playwright and screenwriter Paddy Chayefsky. The film was adapted from Chayefsky's 1978 novel and is his final screenplay. The novel and the film are based in part on John C. Lilly's sensory deprivation research conducted in isolation tanks, under the influence of psychoactive drugs like mescaline, ketamine and LSD.

It marked the film debuts of William Hurt and Drew Barrymore. Chayefsky withdrew from the project after disputes with Russell and took his name off the credits, substituting "Sidney Aaron," his actual first and middle names.

The film score was composed by John Corigliano (with Christopher Keene conducting). The film was nominated for the Academy Awards for Best Original Score and Best Sound.

Plot
Edward Jessup, a Columbia University psychopathologist, is studying schizophrenia, and begins to think that "our other states of consciousness are as real as our waking states." He begins experimenting with sensory deprivation using a flotation tank, aided by two like-minded researchers, Arthur Rosenberg and Mason Parrish. At a faculty party, he meets fellow "whiz kid," and his future wife, Emily.

Seven years later, Edward and Emily have two daughters, are on the brink of divorce, and reunite with the couple who first introduced them. When Edward hears of the Hinchi tribe whose members experience shared hallucinatory states, he travels to Mexico to participate in their ceremony. During the climb up into the Hinchi hill country (a plateau covered in spectacular mushroom-shaped ventifacts) Edward is told by his guide, Eduardo Echeverria, that the Hinchi use in their ceremonies a potion containing the sacred mushroom Amanita muscaria and the shrub Sinicuiche (Heimia salicifolia), which they are collecting for next year's ceremonies. The tribe calls Heimia salicifolia by a Hinchi name meaning "first/primordial flower" in recognition of the deep memory states which it can evoke. An indigenous elder ("the brujo") is seen with a root (presumably intended to be a Heimia root) in his hand, which he asks Edward to hold, before cutting it in order to add some drops of blood to the mixture he is preparing. Immediately after consuming the mixture, Edward experiences bizarre, intense hallucinations, including one of the petrifaction and subsequent erosion by blown sand of Emily and himself. The following morning, Edward leaves the Hinchi plateau under a cloud, having killed, while in his intoxicated state, a large specimen of the Hinchi's sacred monitor lizard (which a petroglyph shown in the dream sequence shows that they believe to have given them the sacred mushroom in the mythic past). He returns to the U.S. with a sample of the Hinchi potion for analysis by his colleagues and further self-experimentation, and continues taking it in order to take his exploration of altered states of consciousness to a new and higher level.

When toxic concentrations of the substance make increased dosage dangerous, Edward returns to sensory deprivation, believing it will enhance the effects of the substance at his current dose. Repairing a disused tank in a medical school, Edward uses it to experience a series of increasingly drastic visions, including one of early Hominidae. Monitored by his colleagues, Edward insists that his visions have "externalized". Emerging from the tank, his mouth bloody, frantically writing notes because he is unable to speak, Edward insists on being X-rayed before he "reconstitutes." A radiologist inspecting the X-rays says they belong to a gorilla.

In later experiments, Edward experiences actual, physical biological devolution. At one stage he emerges from the isolation tank as a feral and curiously small-statured, light-skinned caveman, going on a rampage through some streets in town and breaking in a zoo before returning to his natural form. Despite his colleagues' concern, Edward stubbornly continues. In the final experiment, Edward experiences a more profound regression, transforming into an amorphous mass of conscious, primordial matter. An energy wave released from the experiment stuns Edward's colleagues and destroys his tank. Emily arrives to find a swirling maelstrom where the tank had been. She searches in the vortex for Edward, finding him as he is on the brink of becoming a non-physical form of proto-consciousness and possibly disappearing from our version of reality altogether.

His friends bring Edward home, hoping that the transformations will end. Watched over by Emily, Edward begins to regress uncontrollably again, the transformations no longer requiring the intake of "first flower" or sensory deprivation. Urging Edward to fight the change, Emily grabs his hand, immediately being enveloped by the primordial energy emanating from Edward. The sight of Emily apparently being consumed by the energy stirs the human consciousness in Edward's devolving form. He fights the transformation and returns to his human form. Edward embraces Emily, as she returns to normal.

Cast
 William Hurt as Dr. Eddie Jessup
 Blair Brown as Emily Jessup
 Bob Balaban as Arthur Rosenberg
 Charles Haid as Mason Parrish
 Thaao Penghlis as Eduardo Echeverria
 Drew Barrymore as Margaret Jessup
 Megan Jeffers as Grace Jessup
 Dori Brenner as Sylvia Rosenberg
 Peter Brandon as Alan Hobart
 George Gaynes as Dr. Wissenschaft
 Jack Murdock as Hector Orteco
 Francis X. McCarthy as Obispo
 John Larroquette as X-ray Technician

Production

Development
The film had its origins with a meeting Paddy Chayefsky had with his friends Bob Fosse and Herb Gardner at the Russian Tea Room in 1975. They were feeling "disgruntled" and as a joke conceived a movie they could make together. They wanted to pitch something to Dino De Laurentiis, who was making King Kong. After discussing a version of Frankenstein they decided to do a version of Dr. Jekyll and Mr Hyde. Chayefsky went home and wrote a three-page "dramatic statement and I have never seen something come together so fast."

Chayefsky decided to write a serious film on the American scientific community and the archetypal man in his search for his true self. A producer at Columbia Pictures, Daniel Melnick, suggested that Chayefsky turn a treatment he had written into a novel first, and he agreed. He did extensive research with scientists and anthropologists. The novel was published in early 1978. As was the case with his previous films, Chayefsky was granted full creative control over the film version of Altered States.

Film rights were sold to Melnick, who had greenlit Network while the head of production at MGM, and who had a deal with Columbia. In April 1978, he turned in his script to Columbia. In June 1978, Melnick became the head of production at Columbia, but under his deal, he was still allowed to produce Altered States. Melnick wound up resigning in October, taking Altered States with him.

Casting
The film's original director was Arthur Penn. He cast the movie, including the relatively unknown leads William Hurt (in his first movie) and Blair Brown. At one point, Scott Glenn was a contender for the male lead. Another key role went to Bob Balaban. Miguel Godreau, a dancer and teacher with the Alvin Ailey American Dance Theater, was cast as Jessup's caveman incarnation.

Change of director
Filming was to begin in November 1978. However, during rehearsals Penn resigned after a dispute with Chayefsky. Penn later recalled that the only way he could leave the project and get paid for his work was to be fired. But he and Chayefsky remained friends thereafter.

The eventual director was Ken Russell, who had struggled to find feature film work since the box office failure of Valentino (1977). Russell later recalled that "they wanted a director who has a very visual imagination, and they knew I had that."

Russell later said his agent told him directors who had turned down the project included Steven Spielberg, Stanley Kubrick, Sydney Pollack, Robert Wise, and Orson Welles. He says his agent told him he was the twenty-seventh choice. Filming was then set to begin in March 1979 for Columbia with Howard Gottfried as producer. The film would eventually be done for Warner Bros, in part because the cost rose from an original budgeted $9 million to $12.5 million. It would eventually come in at just under $15 million, with $4 million of that going on special effects.

Russell later replaced special effects expert John Dykstra with Bran Ferren, who is credited for Special Visual Effects in the front titles, and created the VFX actually used in the film. Dick Smith worked on the groundbreaking special makeup effects, which made extensive use of his pioneering air bladder effects.

It was the first time Russell made a film in Hollywood. He later said, "I thought I would hate Hollywood, but I rather liked it. Everyone there is supposed to be terribly materialistic, but Altered States was the first movie I ever worked on where nobody—not Warner Bros., not Dan Melnick, the executive producer, or Howard Gottfried, the producer—ever mentioned money."

Locations
The film was shot at Sunset Gower Studios, Burbank Studios, Boston, and New York City. On-location filming locations included Harvard Medical School, Beacon Hill, Logan International Airport, Columbia University, the Payne Whitney Psychiatric Clinic, and the Bronx Zoo. Additionally, scenes set in Mexico were filmed on location in Creel, Chihuahua, and included real-life footage of Tarahumara people collecting psychotropic mushrooms.

Conflict between Russell and Chayefsky
There were three weeks of rehearsals in March 1979, during which Chayefsky and Russell had a massive dispute. The writer left the project and did not appear on set during filming, contrary to his normal practice.

Itzkoff's book chronicles the making of Altered States and claims that Russell, objecting to Chayefsky's interference, had the writer banned from the set. Chayefsky reportedly tried to have Russell removed as director, but by then the film was already well underway, and the studio already had replaced one director (Penn). The film's producer, Howard Gottfried, told Chayefsky's biographer Shaun Considine that Russell was polite and deferential prior to production but after rehearsals began in 1979 "began to treat Paddy as a nonentity" and was "mean and sarcastic." He called Russell a "duplicitous, mean man."

Russell said Chayefsky "didn't like the color of the paint on the isolation tank. Then it went on to other things. He didn't like the lighting, then he didn't like the machinery, then he thought I was making the actors appear drunk in a scene where they were written to be slightly tipsy in a bar ... There was a lot of embarrassing dialogue, and there was a hell of a lot more in the original script than there is now; it was a verbose script." "I couldn't work with someone else judging everything I did," said the director. "Chayefsky told me, 'I'll just be on the set as a benign influence.' The producer said, 'How do you spell benign, Paddy?' He answered, 'W-I-C-K-E-D'. He was joking but he wasn't joking." An unnamed source close to the film later opined that "two strong artists were jockeying for control and, at a given point, a movie becomes a director's movie. You can't stand over his shoulder. You either support him or fire him."

"Paddy's hallucinations were impossible to film," said Russell in another interview. "He'd write a direction, something like 'Interstellar gas shot through 5 million miles of universe like a puff of cigarette smoke.' But when I read the script, I realized the picture would only succeed to the extent that it dramatized a certain experience common to all men. And that experience isn't gas going through the universe." Russell added, "there is a great deal of dialogue in 'Altered States,' and as I saw it, my task was to make those scenes as visually interesting as possible so they wouldn't be swallowed up by the special effects." Russell admitted he did not "shoot scenes as he was used to having them shot in other movies he has been involved in. I try to avoid the covering shot, long shot, close-up technique. Instead, I try for long, fluid sequences." The director said he felt Chayefsky had never "been involved with a director who wasn't malleable. He would make suggestions, and I would listen courteously, and then disagree. 'I can't use your eyes,' I told him. 'I've got to use my own. In any case, there can be only one director on a picture."

Chayefsky disavowal of film
Chayefsky later withdrew his name from the project, so the screenplay is credited to the pseudonymous Sidney Aaron. Film critic Janet Maslin, in her review of the film, thought it "easy to guess why":

It's easy to guess why [screenwriter Chayefsky] and [director Ken Russell] didn't see eye to eye. The direction, without being mocking or campy, treats outlandish material so matter-of-factly that it often has a facetious ring. The screenplay, on the other hand, cries out to be taken seriously, as it addresses, with no particular sagacity, the death of God and the origins of man.

Film critic Richard Corliss attributed Chayefsky's disavowal of the film to distress over "the intensity of the performances and the headlong pace at which the actors read his dialogue."

Russell maintained that he changed almost nothing in Chayefsky's script. "We shot every word that Paddy wrote except for some trifling changes in the Mexican sequences," said Russell. "In fact, I was more faithful to the script in 'Altered States' than in any previous movie, and I think I did it great justice." "We're saying every word exactly as he wrote it," said Brown during filming. "I suppose the truth is he [Chayefsky] and Ken are such different personalities they found it impossible to work together."

According to screenwriter Joe Eszterhas, Chayefsky had a clause in his contract stipulating that the words in the script could not be changed. Russell, "at the height of his alcoholism", was rebuffed when attempting to change the words, and then "began purposely trying to destroy Paddy's dialogue by having the actors eat while they were delivering it, or having them deliver it in a staccato, machine-gun kind of style, so that you couldn't make out what they were saying." Ezsterhas considered the direction of Russell to have "destroyed" the script and film, which was ultimately "a critical and commercial failure [...] a heartbreaking experience for Chayefsky, who had fought for decades against that, and for protecting his material. It was such a heartbreaking experience that he died shortly afterwards, some say from a broken heart."

Release
The film grossed $19.9 million at the box office against a production budget of almost $15 million.

Reception
On Rotten Tomatoes, the film has an approval rating of 85% based on 46 reviews, and an average rating of 6.9/10. The website's critical consensus reads "Extraordinarily daring for a Hollywood film, Altered States attacks the viewer with its inventive, aggressive mix of muddled sound effects and visual pyrotechnics". On Metacritic, the film has a weighted average score of 58 out of 100, based on 13 critics, indicating "mixed or average reviews".

The initial reviews were generally strong. "It's been a while since I've gotten the acclaim I've gotten on Altered States," said Russell.

Janet Maslin of The New York Times termed the film a "methodically paced fireworks display, exploding into delirious special-effects sequences at regular intervals, and maintaining an eerie calm the rest of the time. If it is not wholly visionary at every juncture, it is at least dependably—even exhilaratingly—bizarre. Its strangeness, which borders cheerfully on the ridiculous, is its most enjoyable feature." She also called it "in fine shape as long as it revels in its own craziness, making no claims on the viewer's reason. But when it asks you to believe that what you're watching may really be happening, and to wonder what it means, it is asking far too much. By the time it begins straining for an ending both happy and hysterical, it has lost all of its mystery, and most of its magic."

Richard Corliss began his review of the film:

Corliss calls the film a "dazzling piece of science fiction"; he recognizes the film's dialogue as clearly Chayefsky's, with characters that are "endlessly reflective and articulate, spitting out litanies of adjectives, geysers of abstract nouns, chemical chains of relative clauses", dialogue that's a "welcome antidote to all those recent...movies in which brutal characters speak only words of one syllable and four letters."  But the film is ultimately Russell's, who inherited a "cast of unknowns" chosen by its original director and "gets an erotic, neurotic charge from the talking-heads scenes that recall Penn at his best."

Pauline Kael, on the other hand, wrote that the "grotesquely inspired" combination of "Russell, with his show-biz-Catholic glitz mysticism, and Chayefsky, with his show-biz-Jewish ponderousness" results in an "aggressively silly picture" that "isn't really enjoyable."

John C. Lilly liked the film, and noted the following in an Omni magazine interview published in January 1983:

The scene in which the scientist becomes cosmic energy and his wife grabs him and brings him back to human form is straight out of my Dyadic Cyclone (1976) ... As for the scientist's regression into an ape-like being, the late Dr. Craig Enright, who started me on K (ketamine) while taking a trip with me here by the isolation tank, suddenly "became" a chimp, jumping up and down and hollering for twenty-five minutes. Watching him, I was frightened. I asked him later, "Where the hell were you?" He said, "I became a pre-hominid, and I was in a tree. A leopard was trying to get me. So I was trying to scare him away."  The manuscript of The Scientist (1978) was in the hands of Bantam, the publishers. The head of Bantam called and said, "Paddy Chayefsky would like to read your manuscript. Will you give him your permission?" I said, "Only if he calls me and asks permission." He didn't call. But he probably read the manuscript.

Christopher John reviewed Altered States in Ares Magazine #6 and commented that "Simply put, Altered States is very good at what it proposes to do – luckily it proposed to do very little."

In Ready for My Close-Up!: Great Movie Speeches (2007), screenwriter Denny Martin Flinn called Chayefsky's screenplay "brilliant" and selected Emily's speech as "Chayefsky's last great take on life and love."

According to TV Guide, Basil Dearden's 1963 film The Mind Benders "is the direct predecessor of Altered States."

Awards and honors
The film was nominated for two Academy Awards:
 Academy Award for Best Original Score – John Corigliano
 Academy Award for Best Sound – Arthur Piantadosi, Les Fresholtz, Michael Minkler and Willie D. Burton

In popular culture
The band Sloan recorded a song for their 1999 album Between the Bridges called "Sensory Deprivation", which specifically references the movie.

The band Godflesh used a still shot from the movie as the cover to their 1989 debut album, Streetcleaner.

A section of dialogue from the film was sampled in Bring Me the Horizon's song, "Anthem". This sample is also occasionally played as the beginning of the same band's song, "It Never Ends", such as during live shows and in Live at the Royal Albert Hall, though it does not appear in the music video for "It Never Ends". On the album version, there is no white space between "Anthem" and "It Never Ends", such that it sounds as if though the sample is part of the latter song and not the former.

A shorter version of the sample was also used by Ministry in their song "Psalm 69".

The music video for A-Ha's "Take On Me" was inspired by the film.

The science fiction television show Fringe, which costarred Blair Brown, contained several episodes in which the main characters use a sensory deprivation tank while under the influence of LSD to ‘view’ a parallel universe, the past, and other planes of existence.

In the adult cartoon South Park season 10, episode 7 ("Tsst"), the film is referenced in the way Cartman psychedelically transforms as he knocks into his hallway walls.

See also
 Body horror
 Genetic memory in fiction
 List of films featuring hallucinogens

Explanatory notes

Citations

General and cited sources

External links

 
 

1980 films
1980 horror films
1980s science fiction horror films
American science fiction horror films
Cultural depictions of Adam and Eve
1980s English-language films
1980s Spanish-language films
Films directed by Ken Russell
Films with screenplays by Paddy Chayefsky
Films about cavemen
Films about drugs
Films about lizards
Films about mental states
Films about shapeshifting
Films based on science fiction novels
Films set in Boston
Films set in Massachusetts
Films set in Mexico
Films set in the 1970s
Films set in Columbia University
Warner Bros. films
Films scored by John Corigliano
Metaphysical fiction films
Films shot in Boston
Films shot in New York City
Films shot in Mexico
Films shot in Los Angeles County, California
1980 multilingual films
American multilingual films
1980s American films